Bosroumois is a commune in the department of Eure, northern France. The municipality was established on 1 January 2017 by merger of the former communes of Le Bosc-Roger-en-Roumois (the seat) and Bosnormand.

Population

See also 
Communes of the Eure department

References 

Communes of Eure
Populated places established in 2017
2017 establishments in France